Asavadi Prakasa Rao (2 August 1944 – 17 February 2022) was an Indian poet, critic, translator and scholar, who is known for his poetry and prose works. He is noted for his significant contribution to Telugu and Sanskrit literature. In January 2021, he was awarded India's fourth-highest civilian award the Padma Shri in the Arts and Literature category. As Ashtavadhani, he has given 170 performances and has written and published 50 books across various genres. His most notable literary contribution is his performance of Avadhanam – a literary performance. He has received an honorary D Litt from Potti Sreeramulu Telugu University and a Distinguished Teacher award from the Department of Higher Education, Government of Andhra Pradesh.

Early life 
Asavadi Prakasarao was born to Kulayamma and Fakeerappa on 2 August 1944 in Korivipalli. His teacher Nanduri Ramakrishnamacharya changed his name to the optimist Prakash Rao. Born into a Dalit family, he spent his childhood in the villages of Beluguppa and Sirpi. He did his primary education in the social welfare schools in those villages. He was educated at Potti Sriramulu Municipal Boys' School and Rajendra Municipal High School in Anantapuram between 1953-1959. He completed PUC at Government Arts College, Anantapur between 1960-61. He also completed B. A.  in 1962-65 from the same college. Special Telugu reader. 

He later worked for a few days in Eluru as a Lower Divisional Clerk after passing in the APPSC Group-4 examination. He left that job as an obstacle to his progress and worked as a Telugu scholar in Venkatadripalle, Y. Rampuram, Kanekal, Kurli Zilla Parishad schools between 1965-68. He did M. A.Telugu Linguistics from Anantapur PG Center (affiliated to Sri Venkateswara University, Tirupati) between 1968-70. Since 1970 he has worked as an Andhra lecturer in Government Junior College, Rayadurgam, Government Degree Colleges in Anantapur, Guntakallu, Nagari, Punganur and Penukonda. He served as the Principal of Penukonda Government Degree College and retired in 2002.

Career 
Prakasarao was accepted as a teacher in Avadhanam Education. He made his first Avadhanam in 1963 at the age of 19. He was regarded as the only Dalit Avadhāni in Andhra literature. He performed 171 Avadhanams, a double octave, not only in Andhra Pradesh but also in other parts of India such as Taruttani, Arakkonam, Pallipattu, Hosur, Bengaluru, Bellary, Donimalai, Delhi etc. His observations were also broadcast on television and radio. He also gave some Impromptu performances.

Death 
Prakasarao died from cardiac arrest at his home in Penukonda, on 17 February 2022, at the age of 77.

Literary works 
Pushpanjali: This book, published in 1968, contains poems recited by optimist Prakash Rao about the poetic glory of his teacher when he went to the attention meetings along with Dr. CV Subbanna Shatavadhani.
Varadarajasathakam: An arrow pointing at the inequalities in society. Vanadhija Manoj! There are 108 poems with a crown called Varadaraja. Announced in 1969.
Niryoshthya Krishna Shatakam: The Asavadi Prakasarao wrote a pamphlet on this Shatakam written by Raptati Obireddy. Released in 1972.
Vidyabhushan: This is a biography of Bhogishetti Jugappa, IAS (retired) who contributed to his development. Announced in 1973 on behalf of Rayakalgoshti Anantapur.
Merupu Teegalu: A Collection of Poems. Avvari Sahitya Parishad, published in 1976 on behalf of Bukkarayasamudram. Dedicated to his teacher Nanduri Ramakrishnamacharya, the book contains poems on the great scholars of his life.
Orchestra: This is a collection of poems edited by him. 1979 Royal Symposium Publication.
Chellappillaraya Charitramu: This is a Yakshaganam written by Tallapaka Annamayya. The theme is the wedding story of Bibi Namchari. The book, which was printed in palm leaves, was edited by the optimist Prakash Rao and published by Bhuvanavijaya Saradapith (Guntakallu) in 1982. Wrote an elaborate preface to it. Determined poets.
Sri Raptati Parichaya Parijatamu: A short book describing the life literature of the wonderful poet Raptati Obireddy who is unknown. Printed in 1986.
Sahayachari Sahiti Sahacharyamu: This article by optimist Prakash Rao was published as a pamphlet in 1986 in the book Sayilila Guchchamu by Nadithoka Mrityunjaya Sahayachari.
Potana Bhagavatamu - Third Skandhamu: This book, written as a simple prose translation of Bhagavatam Third Skandhamu as part of their Potana Bhagavatham project, Tirumala Tirupati Temple, has received several editions since 1986. 
Antaranga Taranagalu: This collection of poems contains 52 passages. The book was published by Navyasahiti Samithi Proddatur in 1988. Some of its poems have been translated into Hindi.
Prahalada Charithra - A Comparative Study of Erranna-Potana: Published in 1989 by the same organization, which won a prize in the Theoretical Books Competition organized by Erna Peetha in Ongole. Dr. G. Chennayya is the co-author.
Jyotissuprabhatamu: Kemunireddi verses, written in Sanskrit, were translated into Telugu by Asavadi Prakasarao. Announced by Brahmajnana Jyothi Ashram, Thiruthani in 1989.
Hanumat Stotramanjari: Compiled by Asavadi Prakasarao, this book was published in 1989 by Dornadula Chinnavaradaraju.
Subramanya Stotrakadambamu: Compiled by Asavadi Prakasarao, this book was published in 1990 by Dornadula Chinnavaradaraju.
Lokalilasooktamu: Published by Bhuvanavijaya Saradapith (Guntakallu). Released in 1990.
Deevasesalu: The book contains optimistic poems (55 verses + 2 verses) that are a message of blessing to the newlyweds. Announced in 1992.
Avadhana Chaatuvulu: This book published by the Anantapur branch of the Andhra Poetry Symposium contains details of 24 observations made in the Kadapa and Chittoor districts. It contains a total of 153 poems. Printed in 1993.
Ramakatha Kalasham: An Impromptu short story of 35 verses. These poems were recited by the Asavadi on the occasion of the completion of shashti poorthi of Dornadula Chinnavaradaraju. Announced in 1993.
Avadhana Deepika: Published in 1998 on behalf of Anantha Kalapeeth. This is a collection of 21 observations made in Anantapur town. The book is dedicated to his parents, Kullayamma and Teacher Pakkirappal.
Domavadhani Sahitikunjara Murtimatvamu: This is an essay made by Doma Venkataswamy Gupta Sahitya Peetha (Kadapa) on the occasion of receiving their award. Published by Vaishyaprabodhi Publications, Kadapa in 1998.
Avadhana Kaumudi: An anthology of 33 observations by Asavadi Prakasarao in coastal, Telangana, Karnataka, Tamil Nadu, Delhi etc. There are a total of 253 poems. Srikalamanjari Shadnagar published this book in 2000.
Avadhana Vasantham: Published by Srilekha Sahitya Warangal in 2001, this book contains 28 observations made in Kurnool district.
Subodhini Vyakaranam: Grammar, rhyme and rhetoric are taught in this book for the use of various examinees. Co-author C. Subbanna. Published in 2003.
Parvatishatakamu: It contains 108 Thetagiti poems. First published in 2003. 'Parvatimatha! Jagadek Bhavyacharita! ' In later editions of the crown 'Parvatimatha! Aasritaparijatha! ' J. Neelakanthanayudu is its publisher.
Avadhana Kalathoranam: With the exception of the town of Anantapur, the book covers 65 attractions throughout the district. There are 448 poems. Published by CV Subbanna Shatavadhani Kalapeetham (Proddatur). The book is dedicated to the 'Rayala Kalaghoshti'.
Pratyusha Pavanaalu: Akashwani Ananthapuram, Kadapa Kendras from the optimist Prakash Rao's speech Suktimuktavali, Vinadagumatala embedded in this book. The book was published by Inugurti Manohar in 2006.
Nadichepadyam Nanduri: Nanduri Ramakrishnamacharya, his poetry teacher, has compiled and compiled 154 poems with emotional beauty from various works. The book was published by Nanduri Shobhanadri in 2006 for poetry reading competitions for students.
Prasarakiranalu: The book contains 15 speeches from All India Radio, Anantapur, Kadapa and Warangal stations. The book was published by Srilekha Sahitya in 2007.
Samaradhana: Wrote the introduction of five writers in this book. It was printed by Palle Seenu in 2007. 
Atmatattva Prabodhamu: In this book published in 2007, Ramakoti Ramakrishnananda Swamy, the dean of Sripurakshetra, composed a poem on sentiments P. Keshavareddy is its publisher.
Bhagavata Saurabhamu: Eleven articles on Bhagavata are in this collection. All these are papers submitted at various conferences. It was published in 2008 by former minister Kottapalli Jayaram.
Sameeksha Sravanthi: This book contains prefaces, prefaces, opinions, and reviews written for 86 books by 58 authors. Published in 2008.
Suvarnagopuram: This book is an essay of the speeches given on various occasions. Published in 2008.
Avadhana Vinodham - Fun Speech: This includes verbal answers given to irrelevant speech aficionados in his focus. There are 171 super-intriguing answers in this book. Launched in 2008.

Awards and honours 
 Kala Ratna Award from Government of Andhra Pradesh
 Jashuva Padya Kavita Puraskaram from Telugu Academy
 Padma Shri from Government of India
Potti Sreeramulu Telugu University - Honorary Doctorate (D.Litt) Awarded
Loknayak Foundation, Visakhapatnam - Avadhana Shiromani Award
Worship Cultural Institution Hyderabad - Life Achievement Award
Bharti Sahitya Samiti, Guntakallu - Kandukuri Veeresalingam Centenary Award
Andhra Sangh, Hosur - Sri Krishnadevarayala Coronation Award
Potti Sreeramulu Telugu University - Karyamapudi Rajamannar Dharmanidhi Award
Sri Doma Venkataswamy Gupta Sahityapeeth, Kadapa - Shatavadhani Award
Department of Higher Education, Government of India - Best Faculty Award
T. Subbaramireddy Foundation, Vijayawada - Kalabandhu Award
Department of Telugu Language, University of Bangalore - Joshua Dharmanidhi Award
Arunabharati, Banaganapally - Ugadi Literary Award
Kalakaumudi, Rajampeta - Centenary Poets Award
Daggubati Venkateswara Rao, Visakhapatnam - Aatmeeyapuraskaram
Andhra Pradesh Official Language Society - Linguist Award
Erranna Peethamu, Ongolu - Best Theoretical Writing Award
AMP Sahitya Akademi, Hyderabad - Silver Jubilee Award
'Daivajnasekhara' GVR Raju, Bellary - Saptati Award
Harijan Sevak Sangh (MP), Vijayawada - Gandhian Poet Award
Tenugubharathi Sahitya Parishad, Uyyuru - Best Literary Award
Kallepu Sagara Rao, Hyderabad - Spiritual Award
American Telugu Association Regional Conferences, Hyderabad - New Year's Award
'Kaviratna' Paladi Lakshmi Kanthanshreshti, Kadapa - Sashtipurti Award
Bhagyalakshmi Foundation, Badwell - Distinguished Literary Service Award
Friendship Forum of India, New Delhi - India Excellence Award
Sahitya Gaganmahal, Penukonda - Anantha Animutyalu Award
Lalithakala Parishad, Anantapur - Mandala Manikyalu Award
Sardardji Friends Association, Proddatur - Best Literary Producers Award 
Kalajyoti, Dharmavaram - Sahitya Saraswati Award
Nanduri Ramakrishnamacharya Sahityapeeth, Hyderabad - Nanduri Memorial Annual Award
Anantha Kalapeetham, Anantapur - Poetry Award
Department of Culture, Government of India - Rashtrakavi Award
Rapaka Ekambaracharyas, Hyderabad - Retirement Award
Pushpagiri Mahasansthanam, Kadapa - Sankranti Poet Award
AMP First Harijan Mahasabha, Hyderabad - Telugu Velugu Award
Akkiraju Ramapathirao Hyderabad - Birthday Spiritual Award
Sri Rajarajanarendra Andhra Language Institute, Hanmakonda - Centenary Award
Gauturaju Hanumantrao, Hyderabad - Gauturaju Literary Culture
Keasvatthayya, PENUKONDA - Gold gandapendera honor
Kshirasagara Sahitya, Hyderabad - Kanakabhishekam
He was honored by Babu Jagjivan Ram, Bejwada Gopalareddy, Kotla Vijaya Bhaskara Reddy, N. T. Rama Rao, Nara Chandrababu Naidu, Konijeti Rosaiah, Nedurumalli Janardhanareddy, Mandali Buddhaprasad, PVRK Prasad, Yarlagadda Lakshmi Prasad, Gollapudi Maruti Rao etc.

Books 

 Kalyanavani - Shanthi Narayana (Editor)
 Asavadi Prakasarao Sahityamu - Anushilana - Mankala Ramachandran - Ph.D. Theoretical text
 Aksharakireeti Asavadi - P. Ramasubbareddy (Editor)
 Avadhanacharya Asavadi - Madabhushi Ananthacharya
 Asavadi Kavithatarangam - Y. Shantamma
 Asavadi Rachana Drukhpatham - Y. Shantamma
 Asavadi Granthavalokanam - R. Rangaswamy Gowda (Editor)
 Asavadi Antaratarangalu - An Observation - N. Hemawati (M.Phil. Theoretical Essay)
 Hiranmayi - Special edition on the Asavadi Literary Golden Jubilee

See also 
 List of Padma Shri award recipients (2020–2029)

References 

1944 births
2022 deaths
Recipients of the Padma Shri
Indian Sanskrit scholars
Indian writers
Indian poets
People from Anantapur district
Writers from Andhra Pradesh
Telugu-language writers
Sanskrit writers
Telugu poets
Poets from Andhra Pradesh
Recipients of the Kala Ratna